{{DISPLAYTITLE:Aryl-alcohol dehydrogenase (NADP+)}}

In enzymology, an aryl-alcohol dehydrogenase (NADP+) is an enzyme that catalyzes the chemical reaction

an aromatic alcohol + NADP+  an aromatic aldehyde + NADPH + H+

Thus, the two substrates of this enzyme are aromatic alcohol and NADP+, whereas its 3 products are aromatic aldehyde, NADPH, and H+.

This enzyme belongs to the family of oxidoreductases, specifically those acting on the CH-OH group of donor with NAD+ or NADP+ as acceptor. The systematic name of this enzyme class is aryl-alcohol:NADP+ oxidoreductase. Other names in common use include aryl alcohol dehydrogenase (nicotinamide adenine dinucleotide, phosphate), coniferyl alcohol dehydrogenase, NADPH-linked benzaldehyde reductase, and aryl-alcohol dehydrogenase (NADP+).

References

 

EC 1.1.1
NADPH-dependent enzymes
Enzymes of unknown structure